Royal Friesland Foods (Koninklijke Friesland Foods N.V.) was a Dutch company that developed, produced and sold branded dairy products and fruit-based drinks. Royal Friesland Foods had a strong presence in Western Europe, Central Europe, West Africa and Southeast Asia.

On 30 December 2008, Friesland Foods merged with Campina, under the new name of FrieslandCampina. The process was announced in December 2007. The EU conditioned the merger to the sale of certain cheese and dairy drink divisions by both companies.

Overview
Royal Friesland Foods employs 15,312, of whom 10,000 work outside the Netherlands. The cooperative's leading brands are Appelsientje, Bonnet, Chocomel/Cécémel, Completa, CoolBest, Debic, DubbelFrisss, Dutch Lady, Extran, Frico, Friso, Foremost, Friesche Vlag, Frisian Flag, Fristi, Milli, NoyNoy, Peak, Pöttyös Túró Rudi, Rainbow, and Taksi.

Royal Friesland Foods is organized as a cooperative, with roots going back to 1879. It has grown through mergers and takeovers, the most significant of which occurred in late 1997, when four Dutch dairy cooperatives joined to create the business in its current form.

In December 2001, KFF NV acquired the Drinks & Dairy division of Numico including the brands Chocomel/Cécémel, Fristi and Extran.

Royal Friesland Foods gained its current name in June 2004 after Queen Beatrix of the Netherlands granted it the Royal status ("Koninklijk" in Dutch) in honour of its 125th anniversary. Prior to that, the company was known as Friesland Coberco Dairy Foods.

Longevity Brand - Sữa Ông Thọ

In Vietnam, the U.S. and Canada the company is well known for its canned condensed milk product, Sữa Ông Thọ (Longevity Brand condensed milk), popularly used in Vietnamese iced coffee with milk (Cà phê sữa đá) drinks, and in various other Vietnamese desserts. Sữa Ông Thọ was mass-produced in the Saigon-Biên Hòa area
and widely consumed in the Republic of Vietnam, produced by Friesland Foods prior 1975. It was used in coffee, mixed with hot water to produce hot milk for babies and young children to drink (since fresh milk had to be imported and were thus expensive), dipped with French bread (Bánh mì) or in other dessert applications. After the 1975 Fall of Saigon, the factories manufacturing Sữa Ông Thọ, along with all other commercial and private properties were collectivized by the communists, and the facilities came under the state company Vinamilk, who continued to produce Sữa Ông Thọ condensed milk under the same name and used domestically and elsewhere in Indochina. Friesland Foods continued production of Sữa Ông Thọ - Longevity Brand after 1975 in the U.S. and Canada for the North American market, especially catering to Overseas Vietnamese consumers, and increasingly to Western consumers as the popularity of Vietnamese coffee and cuisine in general, increases. In North America, Longevity Brand - Sữa Ông Thọ is widely available in Asian supermarkets, and increasingly in conventional supermarkets.

2008 baby milk scandal 

In September 2008, the testing of Agri-Food and Veterinary Authority of Singapore (AVA) found that the "Dutch Lady" brand of strawberry flavoured milk manufactured in China to be contaminated with melamine. This product was recalled and destroyed. Friesland Foods recalled all of its plastic-bottled milk in Hong Kong and Macau.

References

External links
Company website (English language version) 
Royal Friesland Foods media release September 9 2004
 Dairy Industries International July 2004 v69 i7 page 7 article about name change Wilmington International

FrieslandCampina
Defunct companies of the Netherlands
Cooperatives in the Netherlands
Multinational food companies
Dutch companies established in 1879
Food and drink companies disestablished in 2008
Dairy cooperatives
Dairy products companies of the Netherlands
Companies based in Drenthe
Food and drink companies established in 1879
Dutch companies disestablished in 2008